Pete Rodriguez (born April 16, 1932) is an American pianist and bandleader born in The Bronx, New York, to Puerto Rican parents.

Biography
Rodriguez's band, Pete Rodríguez y Su Conjunto, specializes in Latin boogaloo. Their most successful song, "I Like It Like That" (1967), made it to the national Billboard charts and has since been covered several times, including by the Blackout All-Stars for the soundtrack of the 1994 movie I Like It Like That. It received renewed exposure as the soundtrack to the main ident at Odeon Cinemas from 1998–2003. It featured in the soundtrack of the video game Grand Theft Auto: Vice City Stories on the fictitious Latin music radio station "Radio Espantoso". It, along with "Oh, That's Nice!" (1967), was then sampled in the 2018 song "I Like It" recorded by Cardi B, Bad Bunny, and J Balvin. "I Like It Like That" was also used in film Chef (2014).
"Oye Mira" was sampled in the 2021 song "Vielen Dank" recorded by the German hip-hop band 187 Strassenbande. It hit the #5 spot on Germany's Offizielle Deutsche Chart on May 28, 2021.

Discography
At Last! (1964)
The King of The Boogaloo (1965)
Ese Pete Si Está En Algo…! (1966)
I Like It Like That (A Mi Me Gusta Así) (1966)
Latin Boogaloo (1966)
Christmas Boogaloo (Boogaloo Navideño) (1967)
Oh, That's Nice! (Ay, Qué Bueno!) (1967)
Hot & Wild (Yo Vengo Soltando Chispas) (1968)
Latin Soul Man (1969)
Now! (1970)
De Panamá a Nueva York (1970)
Right On! (¡Ahí Na' Ma'!) (1971)
El Rey del Boogaloo! (2003)

References

American bandleaders
Musicians from the Bronx
1932 births
Living people
Hispanic and Latino American musicians
20th-century American pianists
American male pianists
21st-century American pianists
American musicians of Puerto Rican descent
20th-century American male musicians
21st-century American male musicians